Sélection naturelle is the fourth studio album by French rapper Nessbeal. It was released on November 21, 2011 by 7th Magnitude and Sony Music France on iTunes. The album entered and peaked the French Albums Charts at number 27.

Concept
The album was conceived in 3 months during the summer of 2011. In an interview with Canal Street, Nessbeal explained that he was preparing an "Operation Desert Storm" with his producer Skread. This operation consisted of releasing three consecutive albums: Orelsan's Le chant des sirènes in September, Sélection naturelle in November and Isleym's Où ça nous mène later on. Skread would therefore provide majority of the production for the three albums.

In the same interview, Nessbeal revealed the origin of the title of his fourth album.

Singles
Sélection naturelle produced 3 singles:
 "L'histoire d'un mec qui coule" was released as the album's lead single on 16 August 2011, but did not chart.
 "Force et honneur" was released as the album's second single on 6 October 2011. It peaked at number 58 on the French Singles Chart.
 "Gunshot" was released as the album's third single on 14 October 2011, but did not chart.

Track listing

Chart performance

References

2011 albums
Nessbeal albums
7th Magnitude albums
Albums produced by Skread